Pante Macassar is a city in the Pante Macassar administrative post on the north coast of East Timor,  to the west of Dili, the nation's capital. It has a population of 4,730 (Stand 2006). It is the capital of the Oecusse exclave (former Oecussi-Ambeno).

The name literally means "beach of Makassar," alluding to the erstwhile trade with Makassar in Sulawesi (South Celebes). Locally Pante Macassar is known also as "Oecussi," which is commonly translated as "water pot", and was the name of one of the two original kingdoms that form the exclave. The other was Ambeno. During the Portuguese colonisation, the city was also known as Vila Taveiro.

Lifau, in the outskirts of the present city, was the place where the Portuguese first disembarked on Timor and was the first capital of Portuguese Timor. It continued as capital until 1769, when that was transferred to Dili because of constant attacks from the Topasses.

Due to its distance from the remainder of East Timor, Oecussi-Ambeno, and specifically Pante Macassar, became the first territory occupied by Indonesia on 29 November 1975.

In 1999, in the tumult that accompanied the referendum for independence, Pante Macassar was particularly affected by the destructiveness of the pro-integration militias, supported by the Indonesian army. Sixty-five civilian supporters of independence were hanged, and 90 percent of the buildings were burned down.

Twice a week, a ferry boat from Dili arrives, for a journey that takes 12 hours.

Climate
As is typical of the north coast of Timor, Pante Macassar has a tropical savanna climate (Köppen Aw) with a wet season from December to March and a long dry season from April to November.

References

 Timor-Leste at GeoHive

Further reading

External links

Populated places in Oecusse